Titkana Peak is located on the border of Alberta and British Columbia. Arthur Coleman originally named Ptarmigan Peak in 1907, it was renamed in 1908 to Titkana Peak. It is the Stoney Indian word for bird.

See also
 List of peaks on the Alberta–British Columbia border
 Mountains of Alberta
 Mountains of British Columbia

References

Titkana Peak
Titkana Peak
Canadian Rockies